John W. Taylor (March 26, 1784 – September 18, 1854) was an early 19th-century U.S. politician from New York. He was the first speaker of the House of Representatives from the state.

Life
Taylor was born in 1784 in that part of the Town of Ballston, then in Albany County, New York, which was, upon the creation of Saratoga County in 1791, split off to form the Town of Charlton. He received his first education at home.

Taylor graduated from Union College in 1803 as valedictorian of his class. Then he studied law, was admitted to the bar in 1807, and practiced in Ballston Spa, New York. In 1806, he married Jane Hodge (died 1838), of Albany, New York, and they had eight children. He was a member from Saratoga County of the New York State Assembly in 1812 and 1812–13.

Taylor served in the United States House of Representatives for 20 years, from 1813 to 1833, and was twice elected as Speaker of the House: in 1820 and in 1825. In 1819, he supported the proposed Tallmadge Amendment regarding the Missouri Territory's admission to the Union as a free state (which passed the House, but was defeated in the Senate), and was a staunch proponent of the subsequent Missouri Compromise of March 1820. During the floor debate on the Tallmadge Amendment, Taylor boldly criticized southern lawmakers who frequently voiced their dismay that slavery was entrenched and necessary to their existence.

After leaving Congress, Taylor resumed his law practice in Ballston Spa, and was a member of the New York State Senate (4th D.) in 1841 and 1842. He resigned his seat on August 19, 1842, after suffering a paralytic stroke. In 1843, he moved to Cleveland, Ohio, to live with his eldest daughter and her husband William D. Beattie, and died there 11 years later. He was buried in the Ballston Spa Village Cemetery.

References

External links

The New York Civil List compiled by Franklin Benjamin Hough (pages 70ff, 133, 146, 186f and 309; Weed, Parsons and Co., 1858)

Speakers of the United States House of Representatives
1784 births
1854 deaths
Union College (New York) alumni
New York (state) National Republicans
New York (state) state senators
Burials in Saratoga County, New York
Democratic-Republican Party members of the United States House of Representatives from New York (state)
National Republican Party members of the United States House of Representatives
People from Ballston, New York
19th-century American politicians
American colonization movement